Perla Fernandes dos Santos (born November 28, 1988) is a Brazilian singer commonly known by Perlla. Perlla rose to fame with her first album, Eu Só Quero Ser Livre, in early 2006.

Biography
Perlla started singing in church at age 4. At 15, she officially started her career when she met Brazilian DJ and musical producer DJ Marlboro and he was enchanted with her voice. Her first album, produced by DJ Marlboro, was released in 2006. Eu Só Quero Ser Livre, from DeckDisc records, was a strong success in the Brazilian charts. She sings of teenage life with its disillusion and strange and funny situations. Many people consider her style Melodic funk, but Perlla herself does not quite agree.

With a 32-show-per-month average, Perlla is considered the Brazilian music revelation. The song "Tremendo Vacilão", about a troubled relationship, topped the charts in 2006. "Totalmente Demais", a remake of the famous Brazilian singer Caetano Veloso's song, was the theme tune of the Brazilian telenovela "Cobras & Lagartos" which aired on TV Globo. She also collaborated with the samba group Disfarce; the single, "Solução", was another success in Brazil.

Perlla was engaged to soccer player Leonardo Moura, who currently plays for Grêmio.

Discography

Albums

Singles

Featuring

Gospel albums

Gospel singles

Tours
 Turnê Livre 
 Turnê Mais Perto 
 Turnê Europa  
 Turnê Minha Vida Mudou

References

1988 births
Living people
Brazilian pop singers
Brazilian gospel singers
Funk carioca musicians
People from Nilópolis
Converts to Protestantism
Brazilian singer-songwriters
Musicians from Rio de Janeiro (city)
Protestantism in Brazil
Brazilian evangelicals
21st-century Brazilian singers
21st-century Brazilian women singers
Brazilian women singer-songwriters